This is a list of people who were born in, residents of, or otherwise closely associated with the city of Manchester, New Hampshire.

Arts and entertainment 

 GG Allin (1956–1993), punk rock singer; known as the "Madman of Manchester"
 Jane Badler (born 1953), actress (sci-fi series V; several incarnations); 1973 Miss New Hampshire
 Ralph H. Baer (1922–2014), video game developer, inventor, and engineer; known as a "father of video games"
 Janel Bishop (born 1974), Miss New Hampshire Teen USA 1991; Miss Teen USA 1991
 Carl Cameron (born 1961), former Fox News Chief White House Correspondent; former political director for WMUR-TV 9, Manchester ABC affiliate 
 Jay Chanoine (born ), stand-up comedian
 Louis O. Coxe (1918–1993), poet, playwright, academic
 Matt Czuchry (born 1977), actor (The Resident, The Good Wife, Gilmore Girls and Hack)
 Stephen Dunham (1964–2012), actor (Edward Pillows on DAG)
 Toby Fox (born 1991), video game developer, composer
 Betty George (1926–2007), singer
 James Georgopoulos (born 1966), visual artist
 Jennie Lindquist (1899–1977), children's author, editor
 Josh Logan (born 1980), singer; top 12 contestant in the fall 2013 cycle of NBC's The Voice; contestant on the TV talent competition Rock Star: Supernova
 Grace Metalious (1924–1964), author of the classic novel Peyton Place
 Seth Meyers (born 1973), host of NBC's Late Night With Seth Meyers; former co-presenter of the "Weekend Update" segment on NBC's Saturday Night Live; comedian, actor, comedy writer
 Bob Montana (1920–1975), cartoonist, creator of the characters of Archie Comics
 Patricia Racette (born 1965), international opera soprano 
 Adam Sandler (born 1966), actor, comedian, producer
 Sarah Silverman (born 1970), comedian, voice actor, producer; star of the Comedy Channel's The Sarah Silverman Program; graduate of The Derryfield School
 Christopher Stone (1942–1995), actor (birth name Thomas Bourassa)
 Aaron Tolson, tap dancer, choreographer, professor of dance
 Adelaide Cilley Waldron (1843–1909), author, editor, clubwoman
 Joseph Philbrick Webster (1819–1875), composer

Business 

 Joseph Carter Abbott (1825–1881), owner and editor of the Manchester Daily American
 Aretas Blood (1816–1897), executive at Manchester Locomotive Works
 Jeremy Hitchcock (born 1981), founder and former CEO of Dyn
 Gary Hirshberg (born 1954), chairman and former president and CEO of Stonyfield Farm, an organic yogurt producer; graduate of The Derryfield School
 Dean Kamen (born 1951), inventor of the iBot and founder of the FIRST Robotics competition (resident of Bedford, company based in Manchester)
 Alyssa LaRoche (born 1979), founder of Aimee Weber Studio Inc.
 William Loeb III (1905–1981), publisher of the New Hampshire Union Leader (formerly known as the Manchester Union Leader)
Richard McDonald (1909–1998), one half of the McDonald's brothers, entrepreneurs who founded the fast food company McDonald's
Maurice McDonald (1902–1971), one half of the McDonald's brothers, entrepreneurs who founded the fast food company McDonald's
 Charles Revson (1906–1975), businessman, founder of the cosmetics company Revlon
 Max I. Silber (1911–2004), businessman, scouting enthusiast

Government 

 Daniel Adams (1773–1864), physician, author, state legislator 
 Emile Beaulieu (1931–2016), mayor of Manchester 
 Josephat T. Benoit (1900–1976), mayor of Manchester 
 Albert O. Brown (1852–1937), lawyer, banker and the 58th governor of New Hampshire 
 Hiram Brown (1801–1890), first mayor of Manchester  
 Raymond Buckley (born 1959), NH Democratic Party chairman 
 Henry E. Burnham (1844–1917), U.S. senator 
 Sherman Everett Burroughs (1870–1923), U.S. congressman 
 Person Colby Cheney (1828–1901), industrialist, abolitionist and the 35th governor of New Hampshire 
 Daniel Clark (1809–1891), U.S. senator 
 Channing H. Cox (1879–1968), politician and the 49th governor of Massachusetts
 Joyce Craig, first female mayor-elect of Manchester 
 Moody Currier (1806–1898), lawyer, banker and the 40th governor of New Hampshire; Manchester's Currier Museum of Art is named after him and was founded based on a bequest in his will 
 Charles M. Floyd (1861–1923), manufacturer and the 51st governor of New Hampshire 
 Ted Gatsas (born 1950), mayor of Manchester and president of the New Hampshire Senate 
 Frank Guinta (born 1970), U.S. congressman and mayor of Manchester 
 John W. King (1916–1996), lawyer, jurist, state legislator and chief justice of the New Hampshire Supreme Court 
 Martin F. Loughlin (1923–2007), chief justice of the New Hampshire Supreme Court and justice of the United States District Court for the District of New Hampshire 
 Steve Marchand (born 1974), mayor of Portsmouth, New Hampshire
 Mace Moulton (1796–1867), U.S. congressman
 Eugene Elliott Reed (1866–1940), U.S. congressman
 Alphonse Roy (1897–1967), U.S. congressman
 Nicholas Sarwark (born 1979), former chairman of the Libertarian Party (2014-2020)
 Edward Clarke Smith (1864–1926), mayor of Manchester 
 Donna Soucy (born 1967), member of the New Hampshire Senate
 Barbara Shaw (1942–2021), member of the New Hampshire House of Representatives
 Ezekiel A. Straw (1819–1882), engineer, businessman, and the 34th governor of New Hampshire 
 John L. Sullivan (1899–1982), Assistant Secretary of Treasury under FDR; Secretary of the Navy under President Truman
 Charles William Tobey (1880–1953), U.S. senator and congressman; 62nd governor of New Hampshire 
 Arthur C. Vailas (born 1951), president of Idaho State University (2006–2018) 
 Louis C. Wyman (1917–2002), U.S. congressman

Military 

 

 Chris Carr (1914–1970), U.S. Army sergeant; Medal of Honor recipient (WWII) 
 Robert W. Cone (1957–2016), U.S. Army 4-star general
 Jason K. Fettig (born ), Director, United States Marine Band, 2014–present
 Rene Gagnon (1925–1979), U.S. Marine; helped raise the flag over Iwo Jima (WWII) 
 John Goffe (1701–1786), soldier in colonial America; his name is preserved in the name of Goffstown, New Hampshire and the Goffe's Falls neighborhood of Manchester, New Hampshire 
 John Stark (1728–1822), Revolutionary War-era general; widely known as the "Hero of Bennington" for his exemplary service at the Battle of Bennington in 1777

Science 

 Thomas J. Bouchard, Jr. (born 1937), professor of psychology; director of the Minnesota Center for Twin and Adoption Research
 George A. Economou (1923–2003), optical expert; instrumental in the development of the atomic bomb
 Lee M. E. Morin (born 1952), NASA astronaut

Sports 

 
 Jamie Aube (born 1953), NASCAR driver
 Steve Balboni (born 1957), first baseman and designated hitter with five MLB teams; World Series champion (1985)
 Courtney Banghart (born 1978), head women's basketball coach at the University of North Carolina
 Charlie Davies (born 1986), striker with Sochaux (French Ligue 1) and the USA soccer team 
 Ryan Day (born 1979), head coach of Ohio State University football team
 Mike Flanagan (1951–2011), All-Star pitcher with Baltimore Orioles and Toronto Blue Jays; World Series champion (1983)
 Wenyen Gabriel (born 1997), basketball player at University of Kentucky
 Chip Kelly (born 1963), former head coach of NFL's Philadelphia Eagles, San Francisco 49ers 
 Don Macek (born 1954), center with the San Diego Chargers 
 Hubie McDonough (born 1963), center with NHL's Los Angeles Kings, New York Islanders, and San Jose Sharks 
 Dan Mullen (born 1972), college football head coach at University of Florida 
 Dave Philistin (born 1986), linebacker with Seattle Seahawks and Kiel Baltic Hurricanes (Germany) 
 John Francis "Phenomenal" Smith (1864–1952), pitcher with several MLB teams 
 Sherman White (born 1948), defensive end with Cincinnati Bengals and Buffalo Bills, second pick of 1972 NFL draft

Other

 Jennie Collins (1828–1887), labor reformer, humanitarian, suffragist
 Lisa Anne Fletcher (1844-1905), poet, correspondent
 Mariano Gagnon (1929–2017), Franciscan friar, Roman Catholic priest, missionary
 Marie-Josephine Gaudette (1902–2017), supercentenarian, oldest nun ever and oldest living person in Italy

References

Manchester, New Hampshire
Manchester